Rami or Ramy may refer to:

People

Given name

In music
Rami (singer), Japanese singer
Rami El-Kaleh (born 1983), Libyan-Irish musician
Rami Jaffee (born 1969), American keyboardist
Rami Kleinstein (born 1962), Israeli singer and composer
Rami Yacoub (born 1975), Swedish music producer and songwriter known professionally as Rami
Rami Yosifov, Israeli guitarist
Ramy Ayach (born 1980), Lebanese musician

In sports
Rami Gutt (born 1944), Israeli basketball player
Rami Hakanpää (born 1978), Finnish footballer
Rami Koivisto (born 1968), Finnish ice hockey player
Rami Miron (born 1957), Israeli Olympic wrestler
Rami Nieminen (born 1966), Finnish footballer
Rami Sebei (born 1984), Canadian professional wrestler
Rami Shaaban (born 1975), Swedish footballer
Rami Zur (born 1977), American Olympic sprint canoeist
Ramy Ashour (born 1987), Egyptian squash player

In law and politics
Rami Jarrah, British-Syrian award-winning journalist, a.k.a. Alexander Page
Rami Aman, Palestinian journalist and peace activist in the Gaza Strip
Rami Hamdallah (born 1958), Palestinian prime minister

Other people with the given name
Rami Ismail (born 1988), Dutch-Egyptian game developer
Rami Malek (born 1981), American actor and producer
Rami Mehmed Pasha (1645–1706), Ottoman statesman and poet, using the nom de plume Rami
Ramy Youssef (born 1991), American actor and comedian

Surname
Adil Rami (born 1985), French footballer
Ahmed Rami (poet) (1892–1981), Egyptian poet
Ahmed Rami (writer) (born 1946), Swedish–Moroccan writer and Holocaust denier
Yousef Al Rami, the Arabic name given to Joseph of Arimathea, mentioned in the Gospels as the wealthy person in whose tomb Jesus was buried

Other uses
The plural of ramus, literally a branch, as of a plant, nerve, or blood vessel:
Rami, the upward portions on both sides of the mandible
Superior pubic ramus
 Rochester Athenaeum and Mechanics Institute, the former name of the Rochester Institute of Technology
Rami (Card game) or rummy, a group of card games based on matching cards of the same rank or sequence, and same suit
Rami Barracks, 18th-century built Ottoman military facility in Istanbul, Turkey 
RAMI by J.M.K., a diecast model company that made cars in 1:43 scale in Lure, France
Ramie or rami, a flowering plant, generally used in textiles
Royal Academy of Medicine in Ireland (RAMI), a medical learned society
CZ 2075 RAMI, a semi-automatic pistol

See also
 Ramy

Hebrew masculine given names
Finnish masculine given names